The mascots for the 2014 Winter Olympics and the 2014 Winter Paralympics were revealed on February 26, 2011. A shortlist of ten Olympic and three Paralympic designs had been shown to the public on February 7, 2011.

History

Election 
Along with the 2008 Russian presidential election, on 2 March 2008 there was an unofficial election held in Sochi to elect the mascot for the 2014 Winter Olympics. 270,000 voters along with their ballots received a coupon with four mascot candidates: Ded Moroz, a snowflake, a polar bear and a dolphin. According to a representative of Sochi city administration, the majority of Sochians voted for the dolphin. However, representatives of the Sochi Organizing Committee, which officially selects a logo and a mascot, commented that while respecting the opinion of Sochians, such a procedure is usually held later. They also pointed out, that the final version of the mascot should be a consensus of opinions of all citizens of the country and the result of work by professional designers and market analysts.

Official vote 
A nationwide design contest was held in Russia, from September 1 to December 5, 2010. 24,000 designs were sent in for the contest.

A short list of designs were announced in December 2010, after a jury had reviewed thousands of designs. It was now down to eleven design ideas for the Olympic Games, and two design ideas for the Paralympic Games. The shortlisted designs were presented to the public on February 7, 2011. A live national TV broadcast, on Russia's Channel One, included a nationwide text message voting, where Russians voted for their favorite mascot.

 Ded Moroz (Russian: Дед Мороз) — the character, who can be thought of as Russian Santa Claus, was later removed from the list of official candidates, because if it had been chosen as mascot, it would have become the property of the IOC.
 The Brown bear
 The Leopard — Olympics Mascot
 The Polar bear — Olympics Mascot
 The Hare — Olympics Mascot
 The Sun
 The Ray of Light — Paralympics Mascot
 The Snowflake — Paralympics Mascot
 The Bullfinch
 The Matryoshka dolls
 The Dolphin

Controversy
Despite the success of the mascot selection process, some accusations have been brought against the mascots. The possibility of telephone vote rigging was brought up when the mascot that Prime Minister Vladimir Putin had said was his favorite. The bear was also seen by politician Sergey Mironov as resembling the mascot of the United Russia political party, the current ruling party, leading to accusations of political propaganda.

Viktor Chizhikov, the designer of the 1980 Moscow Games mascot Misha, accused the designer of the polar bear mascot (named Bely Mishka) for the 2014 Sochi Olympics of plagiarism. Chizhikov noted that the Bely's facial features were all taken from Misha, saying "they just pumped him up and made him fatter". Chizhikov also complained that Bely and the other two mascots (the Hare and Leopard) was lacking personality. As a result of these issues, as well as being denied the copyright to Misha, Chizhikov declined to help when asked by the organizers of the 2014 Winter Olympics closing ceremony.

Zoich (or ZOIЧ) was a proposed mascot for the XXII Winter Olympics, which took first place in the official online poll to select a mascot for the 2014 Sochi games. Despite being a popular Internet character, the committee chose not to introduce it to the final round of the voting. Upon introduction and until the end of the online voting, it was the most popular mascot from those submitted. It also took only about 40 minutes for Zoich to take the top spot.

See also
 Misha, the mascot for the 1980 Moscow Olympics
 Zoich, a rejected mascot for the Sochi 2014 Olympics

References

External links
Official mascot site 

Mascots, 2014
Mascots, 2014
Fictional polar bears
Bear mascots
Fictional rabbits and hares
Rabbit and hare mascots
Felid mascots
Fictional leopards
Olympic mascots
Paralympic mascots
Russian mascots